The Criminal Justice (Terrorism and Conspiracy) Act 1998 is a law passed in the United Kingdom, which came into force on 4 September 1998. It stipulated that it is an offense to participate in a conspiracy to carry out a course of conduct that leads to an offense in another jurisdiction. It gave courts in England and Wales the authority to try conspiracies to commit offences abroad. The law also provided stricter punishment for being a member of a terror group. Parts of it were replaced by the Terrorism Act 2000 and the Proceeds of Crime Act passed in 2002.

Background 
The Criminal Justice (Terrorism and Conspiracy) Act 1998 was adopted after the August 15, 1998 Real IRA bombing in Omagh, Northern Ireland. It followed statutes drafted in response to acts of terrorism such as the Prevention of Terrorism (Temporal Provisions) Act introduced following the 1974 Birmingham bombings. During the parliamentary debate, then Prime Minister Tony Blair said that the decision to include the offence to conspire in the UK offences to be committed abroad was made as part of the government's total commitment to defeating terrorism wherever it is plotted or executed. A related law called 1999 Criminal Justice Act was also passed in Ireland in response to the Omagh bombing.

Several other laws combating terrorism were introduced afterward and a number of these replaced parts of the Criminal Justice Act. For instance, the terrorism provisions (sections 1-4) have been repealed and incorporated in the Terrorism Act 2000, leaving the conspiracy provisions (sections 5-7). The high number of terrorism-related statutes is attributed to the emergent legal activism in the UK, which is driven by the fear on the part of legislators of being blamed for inaction after the incidence of a terror event. There is also the public's increasing willingness to give up civil liberties in favor of counter-terrorism.

Offence 
In the legislation, an act would constitute an offence to conspire to carry out an offence in another jurisdiction if:

 the conduct would also amount to an offence in England and Wales; and
 a party to the conspiracy or his agent does something in England or Wales in relation to it before its formation; or
 a party became a party to the conspiracy in England or Wales; or
 a party to the conspiracy did or omitted to do something in England or Wales in pursuance of the agreement.

An offender accused of violating the Criminal Justice (Terrorism and Conspiracy) Act 1998 was charged contrary to s1(A) of the Criminal Law Act of 1977.

Section 8 of the Act required the Secretary of State to report before the Parliament the working of the statute at least once every year. This particular provision was abolished in 2002 based on a recommendation that the annual review did not contribute any real value to the scrutiny through the judicial process of the working of the Act.

Criticism 
There were critics who argued that the provisions of the Criminal Justice Act were obscurely worded and were hastily introduced in response to the Omagh bombing incident as well as the terrorist activities in Dar es Salaam and Kenya, which transpired prior to the law's passage. In a briefing, the Belfast-based Committee on the Administration of Justice (CAJ) stated that the legislation was not only draconian but it also violated the UK's human rights obligations under international law.

References 

United Kingdom Acts of Parliament 1998
Terrorism laws in the United Kingdom